BetUS.com.pa is a privately held online gambling company offering sports betting, casino games, and horse racing. As of October 2020, BetUS is an A-rated sportsbook on SportsBookAdvisor.com.

Products
The company accepts bets on sports and horse racing, and operates a casino. Games can be played as instant play using a web browser.

Proposition wagers
BetUS offers so-called proposition wagers on current events, celebrities, reality TV and politics. It made headlines by offering odds on the effects of global warming and whether the world will end on 06/06/06.

Services 
BetUS operates m.betus.com.pa, which is a mobile platform of the site. On the mobile site, players can submit sportsbook wagers as well as access the BetUS mobile casino.

Live wagering is another service offered by the bookmaker. Live wagering allows players to bet on a sporting event as it occurs. Wagering is paused during critical moments and resumed when the action on the playing field is more neutral.

Unfiltered podcast
In October, 2020 BetUS announced the agreement with the NFL Hall of Fame Super Bowl Champion Warren Sapp and NFL veteran and sports media personality Brian Jones to host BetUS Unfiltered. The show has received several guests such Adam Schefter, Derrick Johnson, Ray Lewis, Kenyon Rasheed, Rick Neuheisel, Kevin Carter, Dr. Jen Welter, Brendon Ayanbadejo, Tim Brown, among others.

BetUS Radio
The company once operated a radio station called BetUS Radio.

Revenue
According to datanyze.com, BetUS revenue in 2022 is about $150 million, which is a huge economic impact for Costa Rica.

References

External links
Official site

Online gambling companies of Costa Rica